The Hoosier Schoolmaster may refer to:

The Hoosier Schoolmaster (novel), an 1871 novel by Edward Eggleston
The Hoosier Schoolmaster (1935 film), a 1935 adaptation of Eggleston's novel, directed by Lewis D. Collins
The Hoosier Schoolmaster (1914 film), an American film directed by Edwin August and Max Figman
The Hoosier Schoolmaster (1924 film), an American film directed by Oliver L. Sellers